The Northern Saskatchewan Administration District (NSAD) is the unorganized area of the Canadian province of Saskatchewan. Overwhelmingly larger than the province's other communities, it encompasses approximately half of Saskatchewan's landmass, an area comparable to that of New Zealand. Despite its extent, the majority of Saskatchewanians live in the southern half of the province, and the majority of Northern Saskatchewanians live in incorporated municipalities outside the NSAD's jurisdiction. As a result, the 2016 census, which refers to the area as Unorganized Division No. 18, counted only 1,115 district residents, which placed its population density at 250 square kilometres for every inhabitant. Because of its extremely sparse population, the district has no local government and is directly subject to the Minister of Government Relations.

History

An unincorporated Northern Saskatchewan region was first established by the 1948 Northern Administration Act. In 2020, travel into the NSAD was restricted as part of the Government of Saskatchewan's response to the COVID-19 pandemic.

See also

 Unorganized Yukon, a comparable part of Yukon
 Unincorporated Far West Region of New South Wales, a comparable part of Australia

References

Local government in Saskatchewan
 
Unincorporated areas